The 2023 Campeonato Paulista de Futebol Profissional da Primeira Divisão - Série A1 were the 122nd season of São Paulo's top professional football league. The competition will be played from 15 January to 9 April 2023.

Format
 In the first stage the sixteen seeded teams were drawn into four groups of four teams each, with each team playing once against the twelve clubs from the other three groups. After each team has played twelve matches, the top two teams of each group qualified for the quarter-final stage.
 After the completion of the first stage, the two clubs with the lowest number of points, regardless of the group, were relegated to the Campeonato Paulista Série A2.
 Quarter-finals and semi-finals were played in a single match, with the best placed team playing at home.
 The finals were played in a two-legged home and away fixture, with the best placed team playing the second leg at home.
 In case of a draw in any knockout stage, the match was decided by a penalty shoot-out.
 The two highest-placed teams not otherwise qualified qualified for the 2024 Copa do Brasil.
 The top three highest-placed teams in the general table at the end of the competition who are not playing in any level of the national Brazilian football league system qualified for the 2024 Campeonato Brasileiro Série D.

Tiebreakers
The teams are ranked according to points (3 points for a win, 1 point for a draw, 0 points for a loss). If two or more teams are equal on points on completion of the group matches, the following criteria are applied to determine the rankings:
Higher number of wins;
Superior goal difference;
Higher number of goals scored;
Fewest red cards received;
Fewest yellow cards received;
Draw in the headquarters of the FPF.

TV partners
The broadcasting rights of the 2023 Campeonato Paulista were acquired by Record TV for the second consecutive year, with their streaming app Play Plus also transmitting the matches live. Aside of that, the streaming platforms HBO Max and Estádio TNT Sports (owned by TNT) and the Paulistão official YouTube channel and app (Paulistão Play) also broadcast the matches live. On 28 October 2022, TNT also announced the trasmission of some matches in their paid TV channel, with pay-per-view channel Premiere also transmitting some matches.

Teams

First stage

Group A

Group B

Group C

Group D

Knockout stage

The knockout stage of the 2023 Campeonato Paulista were played on 11 March 2023 with the quarter-finals and end on 9 April 2023 with the final. A total of eight teams compete in the knockout stage.

Round dates

Format
The quarter-finals will be played in a single match at the stadium of the better-ranked team in the first phase. If no goals were scored during the match, the tie will be decided via a penalty shoot-out. The semi-finals will be played with the same format as the quarter-finals.
The finals will be played over two legs, with the team having the better record in matches from the previous stages hosting the second leg.

Qualified teams

Bracket

Quarter-finals

Semi-finals

Finals

First leg

Second leg

Overall table

Top scorers

References

Campeonato Paulista seasons
Paulista
2023 in Brazilian football